Jorge D. Reyes is an American surgeon and academic.

Reyes is focused on enhancing organ transplant options and availability, improving outcomes post-transplant, and minimizing immunosuppression and tolerance induction.  Reyes is currently the Roger K. Giesecke Distinguished Chair in Transplant Surgery at University of Washington.

References

University of Washington faculty
American surgeons
Living people
Year of birth missing (living people)